Pensacola station may refer to:

Pensacola station (Amtrak), former train station in Pensacola, Florida serving Amtrak
Louisville and Nashville Passenger Station and Express Building, former train station in Pensacola, Florida

See also
Pensacola (disambiguation)
Naval Air Station Pensacola